A Corner in Wheat is a 1909 American short silent film which tells of a greedy tycoon who tries to corner the world market on wheat, destroying the lives of the people who can no longer afford to buy bread.  It was directed by D. W. Griffith and adapted by Griffith and Frank E. Woods from a novel and a short story by Frank Norris, titled The Pit and A Deal in Wheat.

Intercutting (cross-cutting) between still tableaux of the poor in the bread line and the lavish, active parties of the wealthy speculator somewhat anticipates the collision montage which became a hallmark of the politically charged Soviet cinema a decade or so later.

In 1994, A Corner in Wheat was selected for preservation in the United States National Film Registry by the Library of Congress as being "culturally, historically, or aesthetically significant".

The film was also released on 8mm in the 1960s.

Cast

 Frank Powell as The wheat king
 James Kirkwood as The poor farmer
 Linda Arvidson as The poor farmer's wife
 Gladys Egan as The poor farmer's daughter
 Henry B. Walthall as The wheat king's assistant
 Grace Henderson as The wheat king's wife
 W. Chrystie Miller as The poor farmer's father

Release
The film was released on December 13, 1909. Because of an upsurge in political populism, audience reacted to the film positively. Before A Corner in Wheat, Griffith avoided making political statements in his film. After the film's success, he began to make bolder statements about society and politics, such as famously championing white supremacy in The Birth of a Nation (1915).

See also
 D. W. Griffith filmography
 Blanche Sweet filmography

References

External links

A Corner in Wheat essay by Daniel Eagan at the National Film Registry
A Corner in Wheat at the Library of Congress
 
 A Corner in Wheat on YouTube

1909 films
1909 drama films
American silent short films
American black-and-white films
Films based on American novels
Films based on works by Frank Norris
Films directed by D. W. Griffith
Biograph Company films
United States National Film Registry films
1909 short films
Silent American drama films
Articles containing video clips
Films with screenplays by Frank E. Woods
Surviving American silent films
1900s American films